The San Francisco Sea Lions were a Negro league baseball team in the West Coast Negro Baseball League, based in San Francisco, California, in 1946. Following the collapse of the league, the Sea Lions played as an independent barnstorming team.

Demise 
In 1949, the Sea Lions were engaged in tour of Western Canada, when money problems led to seven players leaving the team for the integrated Buchanan (Saskatchewan) All-Stars.

In modern culture
The San Francisco Giants have paid homage to the Sea Lions by recreating and wearing their jerseys three times. The Giants wore a road jersey in 2014, and a home jersey in 2021 and 2022.

2014
On May 3, 2014, the Giants wore the Sea Lions road jerseys against the Atlanta Braves in a regular season game at Turner Field. The Braves wore a Negro leagues throwback uniform for the heritage game which were Atlanta Black Crackers uniforms.

2021
On June 19, 2021, as part of their celebration honoring Juneteenth, the Giants wore replica uniforms of the San Francisco Sea Lions against the Phillies. The jerseys were intended to commemorate the 75th anniversary of the team that played in the West Coast Negro Baseball Association league during the 1940s. During a pre-game ceremony, the family of Toni Stone, the first female known to play on a professional men's baseball team when she played for the Sea Lions, was given a jersey honoring her legacy.

2022
On July 17 of 2022, The Giants honored African American Heritage Day at a game against the Milwaukee Brewers at Oracle Park by wearing Sea Lions uniforms and giving away Sea Lions caps to fans in attendance.

References

African-American history in San Francisco
Negro league baseball teams
Sports teams in San Francisco
Defunct baseball teams in California
Baseball teams disestablished in 1946
Baseball teams established in 1946